Samuel de Oliveira Pires (born January 17, 1989 in Coaraci, Bahia), or simply Samuel, is a Brazilian goalkeeper. He currently plays for Botafogo PB.

He plays as 3rd choice goalkeeper for Santos behind Fábio Costa & Felipe and has yet to make a professional appearance despite being promoted from the Under-20 squad.

External links
CBF 
santos.globo.com 
 

1989 births
Living people
Brazilian footballers
Santos FC players
Uberaba Sport Club players
Clube Atlético Penapolense players
Joinville Esporte Clube players
Esporte Clube XV de Novembro (Piracicaba) players
Red Bull Bragantino players
Botafogo Futebol Clube (PB) players
Campeonato Brasileiro Série B players
Campeonato Brasileiro Série D players
Association football goalkeepers